Midyat District is a district of the Mardin Province of Turkey. The seat of the district is the town of Midyat and the population was 118,625 in 2021.

Status 
With the administrative reform in 2012, Midyat District contains seventy-two neighborhoods of which twelve form the town of Midyat.

Settlements

Center neighborhoods 

 Akçakaya
 Bağlar
 Bahçelievler
 Cumhuriyet
 Gölcük
 Işıklar
 Ortaçarşı
 Sanayi
 Seyitler
 Ulucamii
 Yenimahalle
 Yunus Emre

Rural neighborhoods 

 Acırlı
 Adaklı
 Altıntaş
 Anıtlı
 Bağlarbaşı
 Bardakçı
 Barıştepe
 Başyurt
 Bethkustan 
 Budaklı
 Çaldere
 Çalpınar
 Çamyurt
 Çandarlı
 Çavuşlu
 Çayırlı
 Danışman
 Doğançay
 Doğanyazı
 Dolunay
 Düzgeçit (Zernoka)
 Düzoba
 Eğlence (Zinol)
 Elbeğendi
 Erişti (Tafo)
 Gelinkaya
 Gülgoze
 Gülveren
 Güngören
 Güven
 Hanlar
 Harmanlı
 İkizdere
 Izbırak
 Kayabaşı
 Kayalar
 Kayalıpınar
 Kutlubey
 Mercimekli (Hapsenas)
 Narlı
 Ortaca
 Oyuklu
 Pelitli (Barbunus)
 Sarıkaya (Haldeh)
 Sarıköy
 Sivrice
 Söğütlü
 Şenköy (
 Taşlıburç
 Tepeli
 Toptepe
 Tulgalı
 Üçağıl
 Yayvantepe
 Yemişli
 Yenice
 Yeşilöz
 Yolbaşı
 Yuvalı
 Ziyaret

References 

Districts of Mardin Province